Lazar Vidovic (born 1 April 1965) is a former Australian rules footballer who played for the St Kilda Football Club in the Australian Football League (AFL).

Although originally from Carlton, he was recruited from Castlemaine and debuted in 1989 with St Kilda. He missed the 1990 season with a knee injury but returned in 1991.

Vidovic played in St Kilda's 1996 AFL Ansett Australia Cup winning side.

Vidovic played in 7 of 22 matches in the 1997 season home and away rounds in which St Kilda qualified in first position for the 1997 final series, winning the club's 2nd minor premiership and 1st McClelland Trophy.

In 1997, he played with the Saints as a backup ruckman when Peter Everitt suffered an injury, but he injured his knee again during the finals series, leaving Brett Cook as the number one ruckman for the 1997 AFL Grand Final. Following this he retired at the end of the season.

Vidovic was reported on many occasions during his league career, and known for his erratically aggressive on-field behaviour. In 2004 he pleaded guilty to five charges of forgery. He was fined $7,500 for these acts.

References

1965 births
Living people
Australian people of Serbian descent
Australian rules footballers from Victoria (Australia)
St Kilda Football Club players
Castlemaine Football Club players